Lungotevere dei Tebaldi is the stretch of lungotevere which links piazza San Vincenzo Pallotti to ponte Giuseppe Mazzini, in Roma, in rione Regola.

This lungotevere takes its name from the Roman family of the Tebaldi, extinct in 1745; it was instituted with law of 20 July 1887.

Notes

Sources

Tebaldi
Streets in Rome R. VII Regola